The 1903–04 Brown men's ice hockey season was the 7th season of play for the program.

Season
After two seasons of diminishing returns, Brown continued to find ways to get worse. While their record was approximate to the year before, the Brunos didn't score a single goal against a collegiate opponent.

Roster

Standings

Schedule and Results

|-
!colspan=12 style=";" | Regular Season

References

Brown Bears men's ice hockey seasons
Brown
Brown
Brown
Brown